Wednesday Island is an island  long, at the east end of Wauwermans Islands in the north part of Wilhelm Archipelago, Antarctica. The Wauwermans Islands were discovered by the German expedition under Eduard Dallmann, 1873–74, and were later roughly mapped by the Belgian Antarctic Expedition under Gerlache, 1897–99, and the French Antarctic Expedition under Charcot, 1903–05. Wednesday Island was charted by the British Graham Land Expedition (BGLE), 1934–37, under John Rymill, and so named because it was first sighted on a Wednesday.

See also 
 Composite Antarctic Gazetteer
 List of Antarctic and sub-Antarctic islands
 List of Antarctic islands south of 60° S
 SCAR
 Territorial claims in Antarctica

References

External links 

Islands of the Wilhelm Archipelago